Joshua Antonio Canales Hernández (born 20 July 2000) is a professional footballer who plays as a midfielder for Liga MX club Querétaro. Born in Costa Rica, Canales has represented Honduras at youth international level.

International career
Canales was born in Costa Rican, and is of Honduran descent through his father. He is a youth international for Honduras.

Career statistics

Club

Notes

References

Living people
2000 births
Footballers from San José, Costa Rica
Honduran footballers
Honduras youth international footballers
Costa Rican footballers
Costa Rican people of Honduran descent
Honduran expatriate footballers
Costa Rican expatriate footballers
Association football midfielders
Liga MX players
C.D. Olimpia players
Querétaro F.C. footballers
Honduran expatriate sportspeople in Mexico
Costa Rican expatriate sportspeople in Mexico
Expatriate footballers in Mexico